And Baby Makes Three is a 1949 American romantic comedy film directed by Henry Levin and starring Robert Young and Barbara Hale.

Plot
Jackie Walsh, recently divorced from Vernon Walsh, is told she is pregnant with Vernon's child just as she is preparing to marry another man, Herbert Fletcher.

Cast
 Robert Young as Vernon 'Vern' Walsh
 Barbara Hale as Jacqueline 'Jackie' Walsh
 Robert Hutton as Herbert T. 'Herbie' Fletcher 
 Janis Carter as Wanda York
 Billie Burke as Mrs. Marvin Fletcher
 Nicholas Joy as Marvin Fletcher
 Lloyd Corrigan as Dr. William M. 'Uncle Bill' Parnell
 Howland Chamberlain as Otto Stacy
 Melville Cooper as Gibson - Fletcher's Bulter
 Joe Sawyer as Motorcycle Cop

Critical reception
While Variety praised the film, noting that "Levin's direction gets good movement into the script" and "comedy touches are neatly devised", The New York Times dismissed it as a "frail comedy" with "a few weak, scattered laughs".

References

External links 
 
 

1949 films
1949 romantic comedy films
American black-and-white films
American romantic comedy films
Columbia Pictures films
Films scored by George Duning
Films directed by Henry Levin
1940s English-language films
1940s American films